Spain competed at the 1974 European Athletics Championships in Rome, Italy, from 2–8 September 1974.

Results

Men
Track & road events

Field events

Combined events – Decathlon

Women
Track & road events

Nations at the 1974 European Athletics Championships
1974
European Athletics Championships